Joel Bunting (born December 2, 1997) is an American professional soccer player who plays as a forward.

Career

Youth
Bunting graduated from Bishop England High School. During his time in high school, he was named All-State three times during his prep career and also received three Golden Boot Awards. Bunting also played club soccer for Daniel Island Soccer Academy, where he scored 26 goals and tallied 24 assists between 2014 and 2015.

College and amateur
Bunting played college soccer at the University of South Carolina Upstate between 2016 and 2019. During his time with the Spartans, Bunting made 54 appearances across four seasons, tallying eight goals and three assists. He was named to the ASUN All-Freshman Team in 2016.

In 2018, Bunting also played with NPSL side Greenville FC, making five appearances.

2020 saw Bunting appear with local UPSL side Charleston United during their 2020 Spring season.

Professional
Following a successful trial stint with the club, Bunting signed with USL Championship side Charleston Battery on May 21, 2021. He made his debut for the club on June 8, 2021, appearing as a 56th-minute substitute during a 1–0 win over Loudoun United. He scored his first professional goal on June 18, 2021, netting the winning goal in a 2–1 win over the Miami FC.

Bunting was released by Charleston following the 2021 season, but re-signed with the club on a short-term deal on September 22, 2022. Following the 2022 season, Bunting was again released by Charleston.

References

External links
USC Upstate bio
Charleston Battery bio

1997 births
American soccer players
Association football forwards
Charleston Battery players
Living people
National Premier Soccer League players
People from Mount Pleasant, South Carolina
Soccer players from South Carolina
USC Upstate Spartans men's soccer players
USL Championship players